John Huggett Pimm,  (7 October 1920 – 27 February 2016) was an Australian rules footballer who played with Collingwood in the Victorian Football League (VFL).

Pimm grew up in what was then a Collingwood recruitment zone, around Wattle Glen, Victoria. He attended Melbourne High School and watched Collingwood training sessions from an early age.

Pimm, a centre half-forward, played five senior games as well as games in the seconds for Collingwood in the 1940 VFL season but did not play again until 1946, the lengthy interruption being due to his World War II military service.

Pimm saw active military service in the Australian Army achieving the rank of Lieutenant, serving mostly with the 15th Australian Infantry Brigade, primarily as a member of the 58th/59th Battalion and also with the 57th/60th Battalion. He saw fighting first in Papua New Guinea. Later, on Bougainville Island he was awarded the Military Cross "for inspired and gallant service". At wars end he was transferred to the 11th Brigade for a time, prior to repatriation from the South West Pacific and discharge from the Army. 

Pimm resumed his VFL senior playing career with Collingwood on 10 June 1946, two weeks after he was discharged from the Army, and a day on which Collingwood won.  He played fourteen games that year, including a semi final and preliminary final. Over his VFL playing career for Collingwood (1940, 1946–1950) he went on to play a total of fifty eight senior games of which thirty four were wins. Pimm kicked a total of 112 goals. In 1949 he kicked thirty four goals, which was enough to top Collingwood's goal-kicking for that season. Of the twenty nine games he played at Victoria Park, Collingwood's home ground from 1892 until 1999, twenty four were won by Collingwood. Pimm was made a Life Member at Collingwood in 1953.

References

1920 births
2016 deaths
Australian Army personnel of World War II
Australian rules footballers from Victoria (Australia)
Collingwood Football Club players
Australian recipients of the Military Cross
Australian Army officers
Military personnel from Victoria (Australia)
People educated at Melbourne High School
People from Nillumbik